Castle Gresley is a village and civil parish about  southwest of the centre of Swadlincote in South Derbyshire, England. The population was 1,566 at the 2001 Census increasing to 1,799 at the 2011 Census.

Castle Gresley has the remains of a motte and bailey castle known locally as Castle Knob.

Transport 
In 1849 the Midland Railway opened the Leicester to Burton upon Trent Line through the parish and Gresley railway station at Castle Gresley. The station was closed in the 20th century but the line remains open for freight traffic. The train station has since been converted to a furniture store.

The village has the A444 road running through it, from the next village in Overseal towards Stanton. It is also connected to Church Gresley and Linton via road.

The village has several bus routes available, which are operated by Midland Classic.

References

Villages in Derbyshire
Civil parishes in Derbyshire
South Derbyshire District